Anssi Virkki (born February 9, 1989) is a Finnish ice hockey defenceman. He is currently playing with TUTO Hockey in the Finnish Mestis.

Virkki made his SM-liiga debut playing with Lahti Pelicans during the 2011–12 SM-liiga season.

References

External links

1989 births
Living people
Ässät players
Finnish ice hockey defencemen
Lahti Pelicans players
TuTo players
People from Savonlinna
Sportspeople from South Savo